Pachydactylus griffini is a species of lizard in the family Gekkonidae. The species is endemic to Namibia.

Etymology
The specific name, griffini, is in honor of American zoologist Michael "Mike" Griffin who worked in Namibia for many years.

Geographic range
P. griffini is found in southeastern Namibia.

Reproduction
P. griffini is oviparous.

References

Further reading
Barts M, Colacicco F (2017). "Die Dickfingergeckos des südlichen Afrikas – Tiel XXI Pachydactylus mclachlani Bauer, Lamb & Branch, 2006, mit Anmerkungen zu Pachydactylus griffini Bauer, Lamb & Branch, 2006 [=The Thick-toed Geckos of Southern Africa – Part XXI Pachydactylus mclachlani Bauer, Lamb & Branch, 2006, with notes on Pachydactylus griffini Bauer, Lamb & Branch, 2006]". Sauria 39 (1): 41–46.
Bauer AM, Lamb T, Branch WR (2006). "A Revision of the Pachydactylus serval and P. weberi Groups (Reptilia: Gekkota: Gekkonidae) of Southern Africa, with Description of Eight New Species". Proceedings of the California Academy of Sciences, Fourth Series 57 (23): 595–709. (Pachydactylus griffini, new species, pp. 667–670 + Figures 90–92 on p. 637).

Endemic fauna of Namibia
Pachydactylus
Reptiles of Namibia
Reptiles described in 2006
Taxa named by Aaron M. Bauer
Taxa named by William Roy Branch